The New Powerchutes Gemini is a South African powered parachute that was designed and produced by New PowerChutes of Alberton, Gauteng. Now out of production, when it was available the aircraft was supplied as a complete ready-to-fly-aircraft.

The Gemini was introduced in 2001 and production ended when the company went out of business in about 2006.

Design and development
The Gemini features a  parachute-style wing, two-seats-in-tandem accommodation, tricycle landing gear and a single  Rotax 582 engine in pusher configuration.

The aircraft carriage is built from bolted aluminium tubing. In flight steering is accomplished via foot pedals that actuate the canopy brakes, creating roll and yaw. On the ground the aircraft has lever-controlled nosewheel steering. The main landing gear incorporates spring rod suspension.

Specifications (Gemini)

References

External links
Company website archives on Archive.org

Gemini
2000s South African sport aircraft
2000s South African ultralight aircraft
Single-engined pusher aircraft
Powered parachutes